This is a list of episodes of the 2011-2012 Japanese tokusatsu television series Garo: Makai Senki, the sequel to 2005 and 2006's Garo.

Episodes


{| class="wikitable" width="98%"
|- style="border-bottom:8px solid #FFD700"
! width="4%" | # !! Title !! Writer !! Original airdate
|-|colspan="4" bgcolor="#e6e9ff"|

 Spark 

|-|colspan="4" bgcolor="#e6e9ff"|

 Street Light 

|-|colspan="4" bgcolor="#e6e9ff"|

 Wheels 

|-|colspan="4" bgcolor="#e6e9ff"|

 Joker 

|-|colspan="4" bgcolor="#e6e9ff"|

 Naraka 

|-|colspan="4" bgcolor="#e6e9ff"|

 Letter 

|-|colspan="4" bgcolor="#e6e9ff"|

 Flash 

|-|colspan="4" bgcolor="#e6e9ff"|

 Demon Sword 

|-|colspan="4" bgcolor="#e6e9ff"|

 Makeup 

|-|colspan="4" bgcolor="#e6e9ff"|

 Secret 

|-|colspan="4" bgcolor="#e6e9ff"|

 Roaring 

|-|colspan="4" bgcolor="#e6e9ff"|

 Fruit 

|-|colspan="4" bgcolor="#e6e9ff"|

 Enduring Water 

|-|colspan="4" bgcolor="#e6e9ff"|

 Reunion 

|-|colspan="4" bgcolor="#e6e9ff"|

 Brethren 

|-|colspan="4" bgcolor="#e6e9ff"|

 Mask 

|-|colspan="4" bgcolor="#e6e9ff"|

 Red Brush 

|-|colspan="4" bgcolor="#e6e9ff"|

 Herd 

|-|colspan="4" bgcolor="#e6e9ff"|

 Paradise 

|-|colspan="4" bgcolor="#e6e9ff"|

 Train 

|-|colspan="4" bgcolor="#e6e9ff"|

 Stronghold 

|-|colspan="4" bgcolor="#e6e9ff"|

 Sworn Friends 

|-|colspan="4" bgcolor="#e6e9ff"|

 Golden 

|-|colspan="4" bgcolor="#e6e9ff"|

 Era 

|-|colspan="4" bgcolor="#e6e9ff"|

 My Name Is Garo: The History of Kouga Saezima's Battles 

|}

Makai Senki episodes
Garo Makai Senki